is the tenth single of the Japanese boy band Arashi. The single was released in 2003 in two editions: a regular edition and a limited edition with a deluxe cover art. Both editions contain the same tracks. The limited edition includes a hidden track, the continuation of the group's Secret Talk from "Pikanchi".

Single information
"Tomadoi Nagara" was used as the theme song for the drama  starring Arashi member Sho Sakurai in his first lead role.

Track listing

 Notes
 The limited edition version of "Fuyu no Nioi (instrumental)" includes a hidden talk track.

Charts and certifications

Charts

Certifications

References

External links
Tomadoi Nagara product information 
Tomadoi Nagara Oricon profile 

Arashi songs
2003 singles
Japanese television drama theme songs
2003 songs
J Storm singles